Copelatus sanfilippoi is a species of diving beetle. It is part of the subfamily Copelatinae in the family Dytiscidae. It was described by Bilardo & Pederzani in 1972.

References

sanfilippoi
Beetles described in 1972